The Selby Canal is a  canal with 2 locks which bypasses the lower reaches of the River Aire in Yorkshire, England, from the village of West Haddlesey to the town of Selby where it joins the River Ouse. It opened in 1778, and provided the main outlet for the Aire and Calder Navigation until 1826, when it was bypassed by a new cut from Ferrybridge to Goole. Selby steadily declined after that, although traffic to York still used the canal.

Powers to increase its depth were obtained in 1828, and the residents of Selby used legal action to ensure that the company complied with its own Act of Parliament. The locks were enlarged in 1885, and subsequent history was uneventful, with the canal eventually coming under the control of British Waterways in 1962. When British Waterways also took control of the River Ouse, the canal was marketed as part of a through route to York, and the number of boats using it have steadily increased.

History
In the late 1760s, there was dissatisfaction with the state of the Aire and Calder Navigation, and there were several schemes to bypass part or all of it. John Longbotham was employed by some of the backers for the Leeds and Liverpool Canal to survey a route from Leeds to Selby, although the Leeds and Selby Canal was not officially supported by the Leeds and Liverpool undertaking. The estimated cost of £59,468 was raised in two months, and a bill was presented to Parliament in December 1772, as was another by the Aire and Calder Navigation for improvements to the Aire below Haddlesey. The parliamentary committee found a number of issues with the Leeds and Selby scheme, and generally favoured improvements to the Aire, but no decision was made on either proposal.

Following the impasse, the Aire and Calder decided that a route to Selby might be a better solution than improvements to the lower Aire, and William Jessop, working for John Smeaton, surveyed a route that ran from Haddlesey to Selby, which would require a lock at Selby, where the canal joined the River Ouse, and floodgates at Haddlesey. By the spring of 1774, the Leeds and Selby Canal was supported by the Leeds and Liverpool company, and rival bills were presented to Parliament. The Leeds and Selby proposal was defeated, but the Aire and Calder bill became an Act of Parliament on 14 June 1774.

The company employed Jessop as engineer on a part-time basis, with John Gott acting as the resident engineer. James and John Pinkerton were the main contractors, and construction began in early 1775. A great celebration was held at Selby on 29 April 1778, when the canal opened, having cost £20,000. The town of Selby flourished following the opening, with a custom house which enabled traffic to proceed straight to the North Sea without stopping at Hull. While the canal was fairly successful, there were some problems. There was a  section where the banks consisted of loose sand, which had to be regularly dredged to prevent the sand blocking it, and Elias Wright, who was the engineer in 1797, complained that the depth of only  was too shallow, and that extra boards had to be kept on Haddlesey weir to maintain the water levels. As cargoes increased the canal became too shallow for the larger barges.

Development

The new route provided a better route from Leeds and Wakefield to Hull, although it was a similar length to the route via the lower Aire, but considerably reduced the distance from Leeds to York. Staithes were built in 1781 and 1782, and 1782 also saw the construction of a counting house, a warehouse, a rigging house, a tarring house, a sailmaker's shop, a crane and a repository for old ropes. Two cranes were erected in 1787, one on the canal and the other on the river, while an extra lock-keeper had to be employed in 1788 because of the volume of trade. Ten years later, John Foster built a private dry dock at Selby, where many of the boats of the Aire and Calder were repaired.

Before the building of the canal, Selby had been the furthest point upstream on the Ouse which could be reached by seagoing ships. Although some of the barges which used the canal travelled up the Ouse to York or down to the Humber Ports and the River Trent, this traffic was mainly restricted to coal, and other cargoes were transhipped at Selby. The larger Humber keels, sloops, schooners and brigs, some of 200 tons, carried the goods further afield. By 1800, some 369,780 tons were being handled, and industries such as ropemaking, sailmaking and shipbuilding thrived. In the twenty years from 1801 to 1821, the population of Selby increased from 2,861 to 4,097. Dividends paid by the Aire and Calder Navigation showed a large increase, from £11,625 in 1777 to £32,000 in 1791, much of which was funded by the increase in miscellaneous goods, including wool, bales of cloth and groceries, which the Selby Canal had promoted.

Of the trade above Haddlesey, around four-fifths travelled via Selby, with the rest using the lower Aire. The engineer George Leather, writing in 1822, noted that the route to Goole via Selby was much better than the lower Aire, but that it still suffered from problems. These included the size and depth of the canal, the provision of only one lock between the canal and the river, and that there were no docks at Selby, suitable for the brigs and other vessels that used the river. Meanwhile, the Aire and Calder were facing the prospect of rival schemes to provide canals parallel to the rivers. The Aire and Dun Canal was proposed in 1817, to run from Knottingley to Newbridge on the Dutch River, with a branch to Doncaster on the River Don Navigation, while the Went and Wakefield Canal would join the Barnsley Canal at Cold Hiendley to the River Don above Newbridge. To head off the competition, the Aire and Calder proposed a new cut from Knottingley to Goole, which included the provision of a cut at Bank Dole to maintain the connection to the Selby Canal. A petition was presented to Parliament in late 1819, and as a result of opposition, clauses were inserted to maintain the lower Aire and the Selby Canal, and to ensure parity of tolls on the new cut and the old routes.

Competition
An Act of Parliament to authorise the new route and other works was obtained on 30 June 1820. John Rennie, the engineer for the project, died in 1821, and the following year George Leather, who took over this role, revealed plans for a ship dock at Goole, while in 1824 the start of the new cut was moved to Ferrybridge. Although a boat carrying directors travelled from Ferrybridge to Goole on 28 July 1825, the canal was not then complete. Opening eventually took place on 20 July 1826, partly due to a drought which delayed the filling of the cut. Boats could still reach the Selby Canal by using the Dole Bank Lock. The Aire and Calder company began to use Goole rather than Selby as the destination for all of their craft, and gradually hauliers and boat captains moved to the new location, resulting in a steady decline at Selby.

Further improvements to the Calder route to Wakefield were designed by Thomas Telford, while George Leather redesigned the Aire route to Leeds. The changes would allow 100-ton boats to reach both destinations, and became part of an Act of Parliament which was obtained on 19 June 1828. They knew that this was not actually legal, and a case brought before the Quarter Sessions upheld this position, so they started to make the channel wider and deeper. However, the residents of Selby were not satisfied, and further legal action by them resulted in the company having to carry out additional work in 1832 and 1833. The work included the provision of a new lock into the Ouse, as the old one was in a poor state of repair. Traders at Malton and York petitioned for the canal to be made deeper still in 1833, but their request was turned down. The partially derelict wharf wall at Selby was replaced in 1836, allowing fully laden ships to moor alongside it.

Decline
Although most traffic on the Aire and Calder now passed through Goole, trade with York continued to use the Selby Canal. The town of Selby declined, although there was a brief upturn in its fortunes in 1834, following the opening of the Leeds and Selby Railway, which lasted until 1840, when the railway from Selby to Hull opened. Lengthening of the locks on the main Aire and Calder lines to take compartment boats was completed by 1873, and the locks on the Selby line were rebuilt between 1885 and 1886. This work included Dole Bank Lock and Beal Lock, on the old course of the Aire, as well as Haddlesey Flood Lock and Selby Lock. The Aire and Calder remained highly successful, although little is heard of the Selby Canal after 1900.

In January 1948, private ownership of the canal ceased, when it was taken over by the British Transport Commission, as part of the post-war nationalisation. Several changes followed, until the British Waterways Board took control in 1962, later to become British Waterways.

Leisure age

Before 1985, the River Ouse between Goole and above York was managed by the Ouse and Foss Navigation Trust, but was later transferred to British Waterways. The Selby Canal was then promoted as part of a through route to York, and by 2006, over 2000 boats were using Selby Lock each year, more than double the number recorded in 1988. Today the canal is used almost entirely by leisure boats. Part of the towpath has been included in the Selby Horseshoe Walk.

Because the River Ouse at Selby is tidal, the lock can only be used at certain states of the tide, and a lockkeeper is in attendance when a transit into the river is possible. Operation of the lock is fully mechanised.

Route
From the main Ferrybridge to Goole cut on the Aire and Calder Canal, a short branch leaves the main channel near Knottingley, and a lock drops the level by  into the River Aire, which flows in a big loop at this point. The river follows a meandering course to Beal, where a bridge carries Intake Lane over it, and a large weir drops the level by another . After a further , the Aire continues straight ahead, and there is a sharp left turn into Haddlesey Flood Lock and the start of the Selby Canal. The river section is marked by high flood banks. Haddlesey Lock is normally open unless there are high volumes of water passing down the Aire.

Shortly after the lock, the canal is crossed by Tankard's Stone Bridge, which dates from the construction of the canal and is grade II listed. It is a humpbacked bridge, built of  sandstone ashlar, and is topped by a cast iron balustrade. Just before Paper House Bridge, a drain enters the canal on the west bank. The bridge is a late-eighteenth century single arched humpback bridge, made of millstone grit, and is again grade II listed. There are two semi-circular ponds, one on either side of the channel to the north of the bridge. A similar feature at Lund Tunnel carries a drain under the canal. The East Coast Main Line crosses next, after which comes Burton Hall Bridge, an accommodation bridge designed by William Jessop, and constructed when the canal was built. It is made of millstone grit, and retains an iron roller on the north-west corner of the arch, to protect the structure from towing ropes.

The A19 road crosses at Burn Bridge, and another drain passes under the canal before the site of a dismantled railway bridge. which used to cross just to the south of the A63 road bridge. Immediately afterwards, another original bridge carries Brayton Lane across the canal. Then the Doncaster to Selby railway line crosses at Brayton Railway Bridge, and the A1041 road at Bawtry Road Bridge. The only swing bridge is situated just before the final lock, and is operated by boaters. A wider section marks the point at which the wharves and dry dock turned along the quayside. Both the lock, which retains some paddle mechanisms from 1828 and the adjacent lock house, which has six bays and a hipped pantile roof, are grade II listed structures.

Points of interest

See also

Canals of the United Kingdom
History of the British canal system

Bibliography

References

External links

British Waterways
Selby Boat Centre
images & map of mile markers seen along the Selby canal

Canals in North Yorkshire
Transport in North Yorkshire
Tourist attractions in North Yorkshire
Selby
CSelby
Canals opened in 1778